The Indian Communist Party was a small communist group in India, led by U. Krishnappa from Karnataka. In May 1985 ICP merged into the Communist Organisation of India (Marxist-Leninist).

References

Defunct communist parties in India
Political parties with year of establishment missing
Political parties disestablished in 1985
1985 disestablishments in India